The 1997 Troy State Trojans football team represented Troy State University—now known as Troy University—as a member of the Southland Football League during the 1997 NCAA Division I-AA football season. Led by seventh-year head coach Larry Blakeney, the Trojans compiled an overall record of 5–6 with a mark of 2–5 in conference play, tying for sixth place in the Southland. Troy State began the season ranked No. 2 in the No. 5 in the Sports Network poll, but fell out of the rankings by November and missed the  NCAA Division I-AA Football Championship playoffs after qualifying the previous four seasons. The team played home games at Veterans Memorial Stadium in Troy, Alabama.

Schedule

References

Troy State
Troy Trojans football seasons
Troy State Trojans football